Christoph Müller may refer to:

Christoph Müller (ski jumper) (born 1968), Austrian ski jumper
Christoph Mueller (born 1961), former chief executive officer of Malaysia Airlines
Christoph H. Müller (born 1967), musician and composer born in Germany and raised in Switzerland
Christoph Müller (diplomat) (born 1950), German diplomat
Christoph Müller (producer) (born 1964), the producer of Sophie Scholl – The Final Days and Young Goethe in Love
Christoph Gottlob Müller (1785–1858), founder of the Wesleyan Church in Germany